

Ritual warfare (sometimes called endemic warfare) is a state of continual or frequent warfare, such as is found in (but not limited to) some tribal societies.

Description
Ritual fighting (or ritual battle or ritual warfare) permits the display of courage, masculinity, and the expression of emotion while resulting in relatively few wounds and even fewer deaths. Thus such a practice can be viewed as a form of conflict-resolution and/or as a psycho-social exercise.
Native Americans often engaged in this activity, but the frequency of warfare in most hunter-gatherer cultures is a matter of dispute.

Examples
Warfare is known to every tribal society, but some societies develop a particular emphasis of warrior culture (such as the Nuer of South Sudan, the Māori of New Zealand, the Dugum Dani of Papua, the  Yanomami (dubbed "the Fierce People") of the Amazon.   The culture of inter-tribal warfare has long been present in New Guinea.

Communal societies are well capable of escalation to all-out wars of annihilation between tribes. Thus, in Amazonas, there was perpetual animosity between the neighboring tribes of the Jívaro. A fundamental difference between wars enacted within the same tribe and against neighboring tribes is such that "wars between different tribes are in principle wars of extermination".<ref>{{cite book |title=Blood revenge, war, and victory feasts among the Jibaro Indians of eastern Ecuador |last=Karsten |first=Rafael |year=1923 |publisher=Kessinger Publishing |isbn=978-1-4179-3181-1  |page=277}}</ref>

The Yanomami of Amazonas traditionally practiced a system of escalation of violence in several discrete stages. 
The chest-pounding duel, the side-slapping duel, the club fight, and the spear-throwing fight. Further escalation results in raiding parties with the purpose of killing at least one member of the hostile faction. Finally, the highest stage of escalation is Nomohoni or all-out massacres brought about by treachery.

Similar customs were known to the Dugum Dani and the Chimbu of New Guinea, the Nuer of Sudan and the North American Plains Indians. Among the Chimbu and the Dugum Dani, pig theft was the most common cause of conflict, even more frequent than abduction of women, while among the Yanomamö, the most frequent initial cause of warfare was accusations of sorcery. Warfare serves the function of easing intra-group tensions and has aspects of a game, or "overenthusiastic football". Especially Dugum Dani "battles" have a conspicuous element of play, with one documented instance of a battle interrupted when both sides were distracted by throwing stones at a passing cuckoo dove.

See also

Captives in American Indian Wars
Communal violence
Flower war
Irregular warfare
Mock combat
Napoleon Chagnon
Prehistoric warfare
Religion and violence
Sudanese nomadic conflicts
Ethnic violence in South Sudan 
Oromo–Somali clashes
Tinku
War dance

References

Further reading
 Zimmerman, L. The Crow Creek Site Massacre: A Preliminary Report, US Army Corps of Engineers, Omaha District, 1981.
 Chagnon, N. The Yanomamo, Holt, Rinehart & Winston,1983.
 Keeley, Lawrence. War Before Civilization, Oxford University Press, 1996.
 Pauketat, Timothy R.  North American Archaeology 2005.  Blackwell Publishing.
 Wade, Nicholas. Before the Dawn, Penguin: New York 2006.
 S. A. LeBlanc, Prehistoric Warfare in the American Southwest, University of Utah Press (1999).
 Guy Halsall, 'Anthropology and the Study of Pre-Conquest Warfare and Society: The Ritual War in Anglo-Saxon England' in *Hawkes (ed.), Weapons and Warfare in Anglo-Saxon England (1989), 155–177.
 Diamond, Jared.  The World Until Yesterday: What Can We Learn from Traditional Societies?'', Viking.  New York, 2012.  pp. 79–129

External links
Haida Warfare
Tribal Warfare and Blood Revenge
The Crow Creek Massacre
Tribal warfare kills nine in Indonesia's Papua

Warfare by type
Mock combat